Parbaking is a cooking technique in which a bread or dough product is partially baked and then rapidly frozen for storage. The raw dough is baked normally, but halted at about 80% of the normal cooking time, when it is rapidly cooled and frozen. The partial cooking kills the yeast in the bread mixture, and sets the internal structure of the proteins and starches (the spongy texture of the bread), so that the inside is sterile and stable, but the loaf has not generated "crust" or other externally desirable qualities that are difficult to preserve once fully cooked.  

A parbaked loaf of semi-cooked bread is in a form that is relatively stable against going stale. It can be transported easily, and stored until needed. Parbaked loaves are kept in sealed containers that prevent moisture loss. They are also usually frozen. A parbaked loaf appears as a risen loaf of bread, with much of the firmness of a finished loaf, but without a browned or golden crust (in the case of a normally light colored bread). It does not age or become stale like a fully baked loaf of bread.

When the final bread product is desired, a parbaked loaf is "finished off" by baking it at normal temperatures for an additional 10 to 15 minutes.  The exact time must be determined by testing, and varies by the product. The final bread is then often similar to freshly baked bread.

See also

 Parboiling
 Parcooking

References

External links
"Baking Business", discussion on the economics and techniques of parbaking
"The Fall and Rise of French Bread", The Washington Post
Indy Week, "Shooting at Par"

Baking
Cooking techniques
Culinary terminology